Aruba competed at the 1992 Summer Olympics in Barcelona, Spain. Five competitors, four men and one woman, took part in four events in three sports.

Competitors
The following is the list of number of competitors in the Games.

Athletics

Men
Track & road events

Women
Track & road events

Cycling

Two male cyclists represented Aruba in 1992.

Road

Sailing

Men

See also
 Aruba at the 1991 Pan American Games

References

External links
Official Olympic Reports

Nations at the 1992 Summer Olympics
1992
1992 in Aruba